Alan Chin is an American photographer, professor, and writer. Since 1996, he has worked in China, the former Yugoslavia, Afghanistan, Iraq, Central Asia, and more recently in Egypt and Tunisia as a freelance photojournalist. Domestically, Chin followed the historic trail of the Civil Rights Movement, documented the aftermath of Hurricane Katrina, and covered the 2008 United States presidential election. Chin's career as a photojournalist began when he photographed the Tiananmen Square crackdown that began the night of June 3, 1989.

Chin is a contributing photographer to Newsweek and The New York Times, editor and photographer at BagNews, and the Managing Director of Facing Change: Documenting America (FCDA). He is also an adjunct professor for photojournalism at the Columbia University Graduate School of Journalism. Chin is currently writing and photographing a book on his ancestral region of Taishan and is a founding partner of Red Hook Editions.

Chin's work in Kosovo earned him a nomination for the Pulitzer Prize in 1999 and 2000. He has also won the 2017 Knight Foundation Detroit Arts Challenge. His work can be found in the collections of the Museum of Modern Art and the Detroit Institute of Arts.

Chin was born and raised in New York City's Chinatown.

References

External links
 BagNews essays on: “The 9/11 Decade”: Beyond Pushpins On A Calendar, The Killing of Bin Laden, Ghosts of Suez and Srebrenica, Waiting For Glenn Beck and Broke-Beck Mountains of Madness
 New York Times: Lens Blog essay on Toishan, as part of Facing Change Documenting America, Facing Change covering the Fourth of July
 Interviews with Miki Johnson for Resolve Livebooks on covering the 2008 Presidential Campaign
 Eight Diagrams interview
 The Most Dangerous Things: Interview with Alan Chin, 2003

Photographers from New York City
American people of Chinese descent
Living people
The New York Times visual journalists
Year of birth missing (living people)
American expatriates in Yugoslavia
American expatriates in China
American expatriates in Iraq
American expatriates in Afghanistan
American expatriates in Egypt
American expatriates in Tunisia